Meromenopon  is a genus of chewing lice which parasitise birds.  The species Meromenopon meropsis is a parasite of bee-eaters.

References 

Lice
Insect genera
Parasites of birds